The 2013 Florida Gators football team represented the University of Florida in the sport of American football during the 2013 NCAA Division I FBS football season.  The Gators competed in the Football Bowl Subdivision (FBS) of the National Collegiate Athletic Association (NCAA) and the Eastern Division of the Southeastern Conference (SEC).  They played their home games at Ben Hill Griffin Stadium on the university's Gainesville, Florida campus, and the 2013 season was the Gators' third under head coach Will Muschamp.  The Gators finished the season with a 4–8 overall win–loss record, and finished 3–5 in the SEC and in fifth place in the SEC Eastern Division.  The Gators suffered their first losing season since 1979 and did not play in a bowl game for the first time since 1990, when the program was on NCAA probation.

Previous season
The 2012 Florida Gators compiled an 11–2 overall win–loss record, and a 7–1 record in the Southeastern Conference.  The Gators were ranked as high as No. 3 in the Associated Press and Coaches polls.  They concluded the 2012 season with a loss to the Louisville Cardinals in the Sugar Bowl.

2013 recap
Following their success in 2012, the Gators were ranked No. 10 in both major polls coming into the 2013 season. They opened with a  24–6 home win over Toledo, then fell 21–16 to in-state rival Miami in a game in which the Gators gained almost twice as many yards as the Hurricanes but committed 5 turnovers, including a crucial late interception in the red zone.

The Gators next beat the SEC rival Tennessee Volunteers at home, but lost starting quarterback Jeff Driskel for the rest of the season with a broken leg. Tyler Murphy finished the Tennessee game at quarterback and garnered praise for his play in consecutive wins over Kentucky and Arkansas, at which point the team's record was 4–1.

The offense was held to just two field goals in the next game, a 17–6 loss at No. 10 LSU. This contest would start several negative trends, as the Gators ended the season on a seven-game losing streak in which the offense struggled mightily while major injuries ended the season for a dozen starting players, including Tyler Murphy and defensive leader Dominique Easley.

For the first time since the winless 1979 team, the Gators finished the 2013 season with a losing record. Several other streaks were broken, including 22 consecutive seasons going to a bowl game and a 22-game win streak against Vanderbilt. With a November loss to Georgia Southern, Florida suffered its first ever defeat to a lower division team and its first loss to a current FCS team since the winless 1946 Gators lost to Villanova. The Gator offense was ranked 112th nationally.

Despite calls from the fanbase to fire Will Muschamp for the teams' performance, UF athletic director Jeremy Foley repeated several times that he would remain the Gators head coach through 2014. However, offensive coordinator Brent Pease and offensive line coach Tim Davis were fired on the day after the season finale. Muschamp hired Kurt Roper as the new offensive coordinator.

Schedule

Source:

Rankings

The Gators fell out of the AP Top 25 on October 20 for the first time since the final rankings of the 2011 season, when they won the Gator Bowl, following their third loss of the season to Missouri on October 19.

Roster

Coaching staff

Players drafted into the NFL

References

Florida
Florida Gators football seasons
Florida Gators football